Dallas McLeod (born 30 April 1999 in Methven) is a New Zealand rugby union player who plays for the  in Super Rugby. His playing position is second five-eighth (inside centre). He signed for the Crusaders squad in 2020.

Reference list

External link
 

1999 births
New Zealand rugby union players
Living people
Rugby union centres
Canterbury rugby union players
Crusaders (rugby union) players
Rugby union players from Canterbury, New Zealand